The 2020 season was the Indianapolis Colts' 68th in the National Football League and their 37th in Indianapolis. It was also their third season under head coach Frank Reich and fourth under the leadership of general manager Chris Ballard. Long-time San Diego/Los Angeles Chargers quarterback Philip Rivers signed a one-year contract worth $25 million on March 17, 2020, to take over as the team's starting quarterback, reuniting him with Frank Reich, who served as quarterbacks coach for the Chargers during the 2013 season.

Despite giving the Jacksonville Jaguars their only win of the season in their season opener, the Colts improved upon their 7–9 season from the previous year with a Week 13 win over the Houston Texans and returned to the playoffs as a Wild Card as the 7th seed. The Colts finished tied with the Tennessee Titans for the AFC South division title, with an 11–5 record, but lost the tiebreaker based on record vs. division opponents (5–1 to 4–2). Before the season, the NFL decided to add a 7th team from each conference in the postseason. This proved to be a crucial decision, because had the NFL stuck with 6 teams per conference in the playoffs, the Colts would've joined the 1985 Broncos and 2008 Patriots as the only teams in NFL history to go 11-5 but fail to qualify for the playoffs. In the Wild Card, the Colts were defeated by the Buffalo Bills 27–24, marking the only time in his career Rivers lost in the Wild Card Round.

Following the season, Rivers announced his retirement on January 20, 2021, after 17 years in the league. After starting a total of 252 straight games and never missing a single start in his career, Rivers also retired as 2nd in the all-time consecutive starts list, only behind former long-time Packers quarterback Brett Favre. Rivers' retirement left Russell Wilson of the Seattle Seahawks as the new longest active leader for consecutive starts by a quarterback.

Draft

Staff

Final roster

Preseason
The Colts' preseason schedule was announced on May 7, but was later cancelled due to the COVID-19 pandemic.

Regular season

Schedule
The Colts' 2020 schedule was announced on May 7.
{| class="wikitable" style="text-align:center"
|-
!style=""| Week
!style=""| Date
!style=""| Opponent
!style=""| Result
!style=""| Record
!style=""| Venue
!style=""| Recap
|-style="background:#fcc"
! 1
| September 13
| at Jacksonville Jaguars
| L 20–27
| 0–1
| TIAA Bank Field
| Recap
|-style="background:#cfc"
! 2
| September 20  
| Minnesota Vikings
| W 28–11
| 1–1
| Lucas Oil Stadium
| Recap
|-style="background:#cfc"
! 3
| September 27
| New York Jets
| W 36–7
| 2–1
| Lucas Oil Stadium
| Recap
|-style="background:#cfc"
! 4
| October 4
| at Chicago Bears
| W 19–11
| 3–1
| Soldier Field
| Recap
|-style="background:#fcc"
! 5
| October 11
| at Cleveland Browns
| L 23–32
| 3–2
| FirstEnergy Stadium
| Recap
|-style="background:#cfc"
! 6
| October 18
| Cincinnati Bengals
| W 31–27
| 4–2
| Lucas Oil Stadium
| Recap
|-
! 7
| colspan="6" | Bye
|-style="background:#cfc"
! 8
| November 1
| at Detroit Lions
| W 41–21
| 5–2
| Ford Field
| Recap
|-style="background:#fcc"
! 9
| November 8
| Baltimore Ravens
| L 10–24
| 5–3
| Lucas Oil Stadium
| Recap
|-style="background:#cfc"
! 10
| 
| at Tennessee Titans
| W 34–17
| 6–3
| Nissan Stadium
| Recap
|-style="background:#cfc"
! 11
| November 22
| Green Bay Packers
| W 34–31 
| 7–3
| Lucas Oil Stadium
| Recap
|-style="background:#fcc"
! 12
| November 29
| Tennessee Titans
| L 26–45
| 7–4
| Lucas Oil Stadium
| Recap
|-style="background:#cfc"
! 13
| December 6
| at Houston Texans
| W 26–20
| 8–4
| NRG Stadium
| Recap
|-style="background:#cfc"
! 14
| December 13
| at Las Vegas Raiders| W 44–27
| 9–4
| Allegiant Stadium
| Recap
|-style="background:#cfc"
! 15
| December 20
| Houston Texans| W 27–20
| 10–4
| Lucas Oil Stadium
| Recap
|-style="background:#fcc"
! 16
| December 27
| at Pittsburgh Steelers
| L 24–28
| 10–5
| Heinz Field
| Recap
|-style="background:#cfc"
! 17
| January 3
| Jacksonville Jaguars| W 28–14
| 11–5
| Lucas Oil Stadium
| Recap
|}Note: Intra-division opponents are in bold''' text.

Game summaries

Week 1: at Jacksonville Jaguars

The Colts failed to win in Week 1 for the seventh consecutive season, dating back to 2014. In addition, they also suffered their sixth consecutive road loss to the Jaguars. This was the Jaguars only win of the season.

Week 2: vs. Minnesota Vikings

This game marked the team's 300th home win in franchise history. Vikings QB Kirk Cousins struggled immensely, throwing 3 interceptions, just 113 yards and 11 completions on 26 attempts, and a passer rating of 15.9

Week 3: vs. New York Jets

Philip Rivers reached 400 touchdowns and 60,000 passing yards for his career.  Sam Darnold threw three interceptions, two of which were returned for touchdowns by Colts defensive backs, and was sacked in the end zone for a safety.

Week 4: at Chicago Bears

Week 5: at Cleveland Browns

Week 6: vs. Cincinnati Bengals

After trailing 0–21 in the second quarter, the Colts outscored the Bengals 31–6 to improve to 4–2 entering their bye week. The 21-point deficit is the largest comeback in a home regular season game in franchise history. It was also Philip Rivers' largest comeback win since 2006, coincidentally also against the Bengals, also Rivers' first year as a starting quarterback.

Week 8: at Detroit Lions

Week 9: vs. Baltimore Ravens

Week 10: at Tennessee Titans

Week 11: vs. Green Bay Packers

Week 12: vs. Tennessee Titans

Week 13: at Houston Texans

Week 14: at Las Vegas Raiders

Week 15: vs. Houston Texans

Week 16: at Pittsburgh Steelers
Initially seeded within the AFC playoff race, the Week 16 loss to the Pittsburgh Steelers knocked the Colts to the first seed outside looking in.

Week 17: vs. Jacksonville Jaguars

As one of five AFC teams with a 10–5 record entering Week 17, the Colts were on the outside of the playoff picture until the Miami Dolphins fell to the Buffalo Bills earlier in the afternoon. The Colts held on for a 28–14 win to avoid being swept by the otherwise winless Jaguars. With the win and the Houston Texans' loss to the Tennessee Titans, the Colts finished the season with an 11–5 record and were eliminated from contention for the division title, but clinched the seventh and final wild card slot in the expanded NFL playoffs.

Standings

Division

Conference

Postseason

Schedule

Game summaries

AFC Wild Card Playoffs: at (2) Buffalo Bills

In what would become quarterback Philip Rivers' last game in the NFL, the Colts fell to the Bills by a final score of 27–24 despite coming back from a 24–10 fourth-quarter deficit. Rivers threw for two fourth-quarter touchdowns and led another drive to the Bills' 47-yard line in the final two minutes, but the Colts were unable to score on the drive, sealing the win for the Bills.

References

External links
 

Indianapolis
Indianapolis Colts seasons
Indianapolis Colts